Anoplophora sollii is a species of beetles in the longhorn beetle family (Cerambycidae).

Description
These beetles are glossy black or bluish, with 20-40 irregular white spots on the elytra and very long ringed antennae.

Distribution
This species can be found in India, Laos, Myanmar, Thailand, Vietnam, China and Taiwan.

References

Lamiini
Beetles described in 1839